The 2011 British motorcycle Grand Prix was the sixth round of the 2011 Grand Prix motorcycle racing season. It took place on the weekend of 10–12 June 2011 at Silverstone. The race was won by Casey Stoner, who had also taken pole position.

MotoGP classification

Moto2 classification

125 cc classification

Championship standings after the race (MotoGP)
Below are the standings for the top five riders and constructors after round six has concluded.

Riders' Championship standings

Constructors' Championship standings

 Note: Only the top five positions are included for both sets of standings.

References

British motorcycle Grand Prix
British
Motorcycle Grand Prix
British motorcycle Grand Prix